Nurses is an Australian factual television series that looks at the everyday working of nurses in major city hospitals in Sydney, New South Wales. From the turnstile of medical dramas that come through the doors of St.Vincent’s Hospital on a Saturday night, to the race against the clock of an organ delivery for a heart transplant, or an emergency caesarean operation inside North Sydney’s Mater Hospital

The series is produced by ITV Studios Australia for the Seven Network in Australia and UKTV in Britain where it is known as Nurses Down Under.

Episodes

See also
 Paramedics
 Ambulance Australia
 Emergency Call

References

Seven Network original programming
2021 Australian television series debuts
Australian factual television series
English-language television shows